Hatakambari (pronounced Hātakāmbari) is a ragam in Carnatic music (musical scale of South Indian classical music). It is the 18th Melakarta rāgam in the 72 melakarta rāgam system of Carnatic music.

It is called Jayashuddhamālavi in Muthuswami Dikshitar school of Carnatic music.

Structure and Lakshana

It is the 6th rāgam in the 3rd chakra Agni. The mnemonic name is Agni-Sha. The mnemonic phrase is sa ra gu ma pa dhu nu. Its  structure (ascending and descending scale) is as follows (see swaras in Carnatic music for details on below notation and terms):
: 
: 
(the notes used in this scale are shuddha rishabham, antara gandharam, shuddha madhyamam, shatsruthi dhaivatham, kakali nishadham)

As it is a melakarta rāgam, by definition it is a sampoorna rāgam (has all seven notes in ascending and descending scale). It is the shuddha madhyamam equivalent of Vishwambari, which is the 54th melakarta.

Asampurna Melakarta 
Jayashuddhamālavi is the 18th Melakarta in the original list compiled by Venkatamakhin. The notes used in the scale are the same, but the scales are different. It is an shadava-sampurna raga (6 notes in ascending scale, while full 7 are used in descending scale in zig-zag manner, vakra prayoga).
: 
:

Janya rāgams 
Hatakambari has a few minor janya rāgams (derived scales) associated with it. See List of janya rāgams to view all rāgams associated with Hatakambari.

Compositions
Few compositions set to Hatakambari are:

Naraharim by Muthuswami Dikshitar
Alalagada by Koteeswara Iyer
RakshĀsumam srÎ lakshmÎ Pathe by Dr. M. Balamuralikrishna.

Related rāgams
This section covers the theoretical and scientific aspect of this rāgam.

Hatakambari's notes when shifted using Graha bhedam, yields one other minor melakarta rāgams, namely, Gavambhodi. Graha bhedam is the step taken in keeping the relative note frequencies same, while shifting the shadjam to the next note in the rāgam. For further details and an illustration refer Graha bhedam on Hatakambari.

Notes

References

Melakarta ragas